Ijivitari District is a district of the Oro Province of Papua New Guinea.  Its capital is Popondetta.  The population was 99,762 at the 2011 census.

References

Districts of Papua New Guinea
Oro Province